Fakhr al-Din Qara Arslan (or Kara Arslan) (r. 1144–1174 CE) was a member of the Artuqid dynasty and son of Rukn al-Dawla Dāʾūd, bey of Hasankeyf. Kara Arslan ruled Hasankeyf following Dāʾūd's death on 19 Muharram 539 (22 July 1144). He was the father of Nur al-Din Muhammad.

Coinage

See also 
 Artuqids

References

Sources
 

12th-century monarchs in the Middle East
1174 deaths
Turkic rulers
Artuqids
Year of birth unknown